Filomeno Ormeño Belmonte (June 6, 1899 - November 5, 1975) was a Peruvian composer, orchestrator and pianist.

Compositions
Among his most celebrated compositions are:
"Red Lips"
"When I Want"
"Happy Dawn"
"An Old Will"
"Of Soul and Bead"
"Peruvian Tondero"
"The Huayruro"
"The love Palomo"

References

1899 births
1975 deaths
Peruvian composers
Peruvian male composers
20th-century composers
20th-century male musicians